A dynamic trimming system operates seagoing vessels to achieve minimum water resistance under all circumstances. It is based on multidimensional analysis of real-time data collected on vessel attitude (trim).

Dynamic trimming automates data retrieval from sensor networks, for vessel management software applications. The core of the method is a multidimensional analysis model, which continuously calculates the key forces affecting the vessel attitude.

The system helps officers ensure that their vessels are operated efficiently. The key metrics are graphically displayed to facilitate decision-making.
The system aims to continuously optimize vessel trim, thus minimizing water resistance and reducing fuel consumption.

References

Sailing
Vehicle technology
Transport software